Gas Pump Girls is a 1979 American comedy film. Directed by Joel Bender, it stars Kirsten Baker as June. Following their high school graduation, June and her friends take over the operation of her uncle's gasoline station, which faces stiff competition from the newer, bigger, more modern station that has recently opened across the street.

Plot summary
The film's plot follows the adventures of June (Kirsten Baker) and her friends, who after their senior year of high school, agree to help out at the failing gas and service station run by June's uncle, played by (Huntz Hall).

However, right across the street is another station, run by Mr. Friendly (Dave Shelley), a devious businessman. His goal is to put his rival out of business.

It seems like fate might be working in the villain's favor. Uncle Joe has been struck by a heart attack and can no longer run the business. When Uncle Joe's doctor tells him he must sell the gasoline station that he has operated for more than 20 years, June decides to take it over and get her friends to work for her as gas-pump attendants. The girls wear uniforms consisting of halter tops and short shorts, labelled either "Regular" or "Super Duper" (for high-octane fuel). Michael and his male friends work as mechanics in the body shop. June also installs a public address (PA) system, over which she announces the station's services, using sexually suggestive phrases and double entendres. Business is soon booming, much to Mr. Friendly's chagrin.

The Vultures, a local motorcycle gang, vandalize the station, but June soon puts her feminine charms to work to recruit them to her cause, putting them to work as her tow truck-driving team. (Ken Lerner plays Peewee, one of the bikers.)

Mr. Friendly hires two mobsters to murder June. The mobsters are played by screen veterans Mike Mazurki and Joe E. Ross, best known for playing bumbling police officer Toody on Car 54, Where Are You? However, when they threaten her, she flips the switch on the PA system, alerting the others. Having returned from towing a vehicle, the Vultures hatch a plan: while the girls pace back and forth, topless, to distract the mobsters, the Vultures, waiting just outside the doorway to the station's office, club the men over the head, knocking them unconscious.

Next, Mr. Friendly convinces the gasoline supplier not to deliver supplies to June's station. Without a product to sell, the station is out of business, until June finds a way to get more fuel to sell; they visit their competitor, asking to have the gas tank of Michael's car filled. As the vehicle is refueled, one of the boys, hidden beneath the car, siphons the gasoline into a storage tank, so that the car seems to hold much more fuel than it needs. By making two visits, using the same vehicle, the friends are able to obtain more regular and high-octane gasoline to sell at their own station. This scheme is successful, but only for the near term, and they are soon out of product again. They are all about to admit defeat until Mr. Friendly pays them an unfriendly visit to mock their attempt to compete against him, and June rallies them.

She intercepts the fuel deliveryman, who tells her to follow him if she wants to see where the president of the fuel company works, but warns her that he refuses to see anyone but oil sheiks.

June and her friends follow the deliveryman, but the security guard at the gate refuses to allow them to enter the company's property. June hits on a plan. The Vultures will don helmets, posing as a security force, and she and the other teens will dress as oil sheiks. This time, the guard permits them to enter, and they are ushered into the president's office. June removes her disguise, and, attracted to her in her brief uniform, the president listens to her story concerning how her friends and she have attempted to save her ailing uncle's family business, despite the unfair competition that Mr. Friendly has posed, which includes his having hired hit men to murder her.

Outraged at Mr. Friendly's conduct, the president discontinues his franchise, and June takes over the Pyramid gas station and garage. Her uncle recovers and returns to manage the business, and June and her friends enjoy their postgraduation freedom.

Selected cast
Kirsten Baker - June
Dennis Bowen - Roger
Huntz Hall - Uncle Joe
Sandy Johnson - April
Leslie King - Jane
Linda Lawrence - Betty
Rikki Marin - January
Steve Bond - Butch
Ken Lerner - PeeWee
Joe E. Ross - Bruno
Mike Mazurki - Moiv

Home media
The film was released twice on DVD, March 11, 2008 and May 22, 2012.  It was later released on Blu-ray on April 30, 2019.

References

External links

1979 films
Golan-Globus films
1970s English-language films
American comedy films
1970s American films